The Hong Kong Film Award for Best Asian Chinese Language Film is an annual Hong Kong industry award presented for a film considered the best of the year. In order to be eligible for the award films must be in a Chinese language and have either at least one film company legally registered in Asia Region or at least one distribution company legally registered in Hong Kong.

History
This award replaced the Hong Kong Film Award for Best Film from Mainland and Taiwan.
The first award was presented during the 2020 39th Hong Kong Film Awards ceremony.

Winners and nominees

References

External links

Awards established in 2020
Hong Kong Film Awards